Gianfranco D'Angelo (19 August 1936 – 15 August 2021) was an Italian actor and comedian.

Biography
Born in Rome, D'Angelo started his career as a comedian in the mid-1960s, achieving his first successes with the theatrical company "Il Bagaglino".   His career was launched in the mid-1970s, with a series of successful variety shows such as Mazzabubù, C'era una volta Roma, La Sberla, and reached its peak in the following decade, with Drive In, Odiens and Striscia la notizia. D'Angelo was also very active in cinema between 1974 and 1982, but his film activity was limited to "sexy comedies" and B-movies.

D'Angelo died after a short illness on 15 August 2021 at the Gemelli Hospital in Rome, a few days before he turned 85. The funeral was celebrated on 17 August in the Church of the Artists in Piazza del Popolo in Rome.

Filmography 

 Mondo candido (1975)
 Lover Boy (1975)
 The School Teacher (1975)
 La liceale (1975)
 Confessions of a Lady Cop (1976)
 La professoressa di scienze naturali (1976)
 Classe mista (1976)
 La dottoressa del distretto militare (1976)
 Una bella governante di colore (1976)
 Nerone (1977)
 Maschio latino cercasi (1977)
 Taxi Girl (1977)
 Per amore di Poppea (1977)
 La compagna di banco (1977)
 The Schoolteacher Goes to Boys' High (1977)
 La liceale nella classe dei ripetenti (1978)
 La settimana bianca (1980)
 Giovani, belle... probabilmente ricche (1982)
 La gorilla (1982)
 Rimini Rimini – Un anno dopo (1988)

References

Further reading

External links 
 

1936 births
2021 deaths
Italian male film actors
Male actors from Rome
Italian television personalities
Italian male stage actors